Capo al Berdato is a mountain in the department of Haute-Corse on the island of Corsica, France.
It is in the Monte Cinto massif.

Location

Capu al Berdato is in the northwest of the island, in the Monte Cinto massif.
The commune of Asco is to the north and northeast, Lozzi is to the south and southeast, and Corscia is to the east.
The D147 road runs to the north of the mountain down the Asco river valley to the village of Asco.
Lac Maggiore is below the peak to the east.

Physical

It is connected to  Monte Cinto to the southwest by the Créte de Sellola, a ridge.
Another ridge, the Pianu di Terra Corsica, connects it to the  Capu Terra Corsica to the southeast.
A third ridge connects it to the  Capu Biancu to the northeast.
The north and west of the mountain is drained by tributaries of the Asco river, while the south and east of the mountain is drained by tributaries of the Golo river.

Gallery

Notes

Citations

Sources

Mountains of Haute-Corse